Margarites toroides is a species of sea snail, a marine gastropod mollusc in the family Margaritidae.

References

External links
 To World Register of Marine Species

toroides
Gastropods described in 2011